Unione Sportiva Pergolettese 1932 is an Italian association football club, based in Crema, province of Cremona, Lombardy. It currently plays in Serie C, the third level of Italian football.

History

From Pergolettese to Pergocrema 
The origins of the football in Crema go back to 1932 when U.S. Pergolettese was founded in Pergoletto, a suburb of the town.

In 1974 the club was renamed U.S. Pergocrema 1932.

In the Serie C2 2007–08 regular season the team finished first in Girone A, winning direct promotion to the now called Lega Pro Prima Divisione for the 2008–09 season. In that season Pergocrema obtain an historical 11th place, the best result of all times for the team.

In the 2009-10 Lega Pro Season, Pergocrema finished 15th and were forced to play in the relegation playoffs.  They were matched up against 16th-placed Pro Patria, and survived by being the higher classified team after the 2-legged playout finished in a 3–3 aggregate tie.

The bankruptcy and rebirth 
On 20 June 2012 with the club in strong financial difficulty, Pergocrema was declared bankrupt by the court of Crema and the team was disbanded.

The club generated paper-profit by selling Diego Manzoni for €500,000 in 2009 but directly in exchange for two players Francesco Pambianchi and Niccolò Galli for €250,000 each. In June 2011, one year before the bankruptcy, both players returned to Parma for €125,000 each but again in pure exchange deal, for Makris Petrozzi for €250,000.

At the end of the 2011–12 Serie D season, A.S. Pizzighettone moved to city of Crema and changed its name to U.S. Pergolettese 1932 in order to continue the soccer history of U.S. Pergocrema 1932.

Pergolettese was promoted to 2013–14 Lega Pro Seconda Divisione in 2013. The club returned to professionalism in 2019 after winning the Serie D/C title against the likes of fallen giants Modena and Reggio Audace (formerly Reggiana), under the tenure of former Serie A defender Matteo Contini as head coach.

Colors and badge 
The team's colors are yellow and blue. The badge is a yellow shield with a blue oblique stripe with written inside "Pergolettese".

Supporters and rivalries 
The fans of Pergolettese are allied with fans of Piacenza, because of the common enmity towards the fans from Cremona, the Cremonese. The fans also  maintain friendships with the fans of Benevento, Nuorese and the Belgian Union Saint-Gilloise fans from Brussels.

They contest the city derby with AC Crema, with whom they share their stadium. They also have strong rivalries with Mantova, Pro Patria, Trento, Fanfulla, Sant'Angelo and Lecco.

The most famous organized groups of fans can remember le Brigate, the Cannyballs, the Ultras Pergo 93, and Stoned Again.

Players

Current squad
.

Pictures

References

External links 
 Official Site 

 
Football clubs in Lombardy
Association football clubs established in 1932
Serie C clubs
1932 establishments in Italy